Skule Waksvik  (22 December 1927 – 7 February 2018) was a Norwegian sculptor.

He was born in Strinda to painter Bjarne Sigfred Waksvik and Gudrun Bøe. He was married three times, first to textile artist Karin Sundbye, then to Aasa Lageraaen, and finally to Cathrine Stang.

Waksvik is particularly known for his animal sculptures, such as Hønefontenen at the Storting, Sjøløve at the National Gallery of Norway, Fontene med sjøløver in Haugesund, Fire elger in Elverum, and Avlsokse in Hamar. He has also portrayed Petter Dass and the fictional Ann-Magritt from Johan Falkberget's books.

References

1927 births
2018 deaths
People from Trondheim
Norwegian sculptors